Ni Yuefeng (born September 1964) is a Chinese politician who is the current party secretary of Hebei, in office since April 2022.  Previously he served as head and party branch secretary of the General Administration of Customs and before that, party secretary of Fuzhou and deputy party secretary of Fujian. 

He is a representative of the 19th National Congress of the Chinese Communist Party and a member of the 19th Central Committee of the Chinese Communist Party. He was an alternate member of the 18th Central Committee of the Chinese Communist Party. He was a member of the Standing Committee of the 10th and 11th National People's Congress.

Biography
Ni was born in Yuexi County, Anhui, in September 1964. In 1980, he entered Hefei University of Technology, majoring in industrial automation. After graduation, he taught at the university. He went on to receive his doctor's degree in systems engineering in 1990 at Tsinghua University. 

Ni joined the Chinese Communist Party (CCP) in March 1985, and got involved in politics in July 1993, when he was assigned to the Qingdao Municipal People's Government in east China's Shandong province. He was transferred to the State Oceanic Administration in July 1998 and two years later rose to become its deputy head. In March 2003, he joined the National People's Congress Environment and Resources Protection Committee, where he was prompted to vice chairperson in February 2008.

In February 2011, he was transferred to south China's Fujian province and appointed vice governor. He was appointed secretary of Fujian Commission for Discipline Inspection in June 2013 and was admitted to member of the standing committee of the CCP Fujian Provincial Committee, the province's top authority. He concurrently served as party secretary of the capital city Fuzhou since August 2016.

In May 2017, he was promoted to be party branch secretary of the General Administration of Customs, concurrently holding the head position since March 2018.

In April 2022, he was despatched to north China's Hebei province and appointed party secretary of Hebei, the top political position in the province.

References

1964 births
Living people
People from Yuexi County, Anhui
Hefei University of Technology alumni
Tsinghua University alumni
People's Republic of China politicians from Anhui
Chinese Communist Party politicians from Anhui
Members of the Standing Committee of the 10th National People's Congress
Members of the Standing Committee of the 11th National People's Congress
Alternate members of the 18th Central Committee of the Chinese Communist Party
Members of the 19th Central Committee of the Chinese Communist Party